Moro Canyon is a canyon and seasonal stream near Laguna Beach, Orange County, California in the Crystal Cove State Park. Moro Canyon Creek originates at the summit of the San Joaquin Hills and flows southwest, under Pacific Coast Highway to empty into the Pacific Ocean at Moro Beach.

The Moro Ridge Trail, along the South Rim, provides access to the Upper Moro and Lower Moro Campgrounds.

One of the first developments in Crystal Cove State Park was Tyron's Camp, opened in 1927 along the PCH at Moro Canyon.

See also
List of rivers of Orange County, California

References

Rivers of Orange County, California